Tarnowa may refer to the following places:
Tarnowa, Grodzisk Wielkopolski County in Greater Poland Voivodeship (west-central Poland)
Tarnowa, Gmina Brudzew in Greater Poland Voivodeship (west-central Poland)
Tarnowa, Łódź Voivodeship (central Poland)
Tarnowa, Gmina Tuliszków in Greater Poland Voivodeship (west-central Poland)
Tarnowa, Września County in Greater Poland Voivodeship (west-central Poland)